Gabe Emmanuel Turner (born 21 December 1980) is a British director and executive producer, known for directing the documentary films In The Hands of The Gods, The Class of '92, and I Am Bolt. He is a partner at Fulwell 73, a production company.

Early life 
Turner was born in London.

Career 
Turner has worked as a producer, director and writer.

In 2007, he directed his first documentary In the Hands of the Gods with his brother Ben Turner.

In 2013, he directed the documentary film The Class of '92, about six Manchester United players: David Beckham, Nicky Butt, Ryan Giggs, Gary Neville, Phil Neville and Paul Scholes.

In 2014, Turner wrote and directed his first scripted feature film, The Guvnors, which won two National Film Awards. 

In 2015, Turner was attached to a documentary on Usain Bolt, following the Rio Olympics in 2016.

Turner made music videos for One Direction, Demi Lovato, Harry Styles, and Olly Murs.

Personal life
Turner supports Sunderland A.F.C.

References

1980 births
Living people
British documentary filmmakers
British film directors
British film producers
British music video directors